Rectoris longibarbus is a species of cyprinid of the genus Rectoris.

References

Cyprinid fish of Asia
Freshwater fish of China